Morris "Morrie" Ryskind (October 20, 1895 – August 24, 1985) was an American dramatist, lyricist and writer of theatrical productions and movies, who became a conservative political activist later in life.

Life and career 
Ryskind was born in Brooklyn, New York, the son of Russian Jewish immigrants, Ida (Edelson) and Abraham Ryskind. He attended Columbia University but was suspended shortly before he was due to graduate after he called university president Nicholas Murray Butler "Czar Nicholas" in the pages of the humor magazine Jester in 1917. Ryskind was criticizing Butler for refusing to allow Ilya Tolstoy speak on campus.

From 1927 to 1945, Ryskind was author of numerous scripts and musical lyrics for Broadway productions and Hollywood movies and later directed a number of such productions as well. He collaborated with George S. Kaufman on several Broadway hits. In 1933, he earned the Pulitzer Prize (receiving the prize from the same Nicholas Murray Butler who had suspended him from Columbia University) for Drama for the Broadway production Of Thee I Sing, a musical written in collaboration with composer George Gershwin.

Ryskind wrote or co-wrote several Marx Brothers theatrical and screenplays, including the book for the Broadway musical Animal Crackers (1929) (with Kaufman), and he wrote the screenplays for the film versions of The Cocoanuts (1929) and Animal Crackers (1930).

Later he co-wrote, again with Kaufman, the screenplay for A Night at the Opera (1935), which helped revive interest in the Marx Brothers and was selected by the American Film Institute as among the top 100 comedy films. In working on that script, Ryskind was heavily involved in the "cleanup process," watching the Brothers repeatedly perform sections of the play before live audiences to determine which lines worked and which did not. In an interview with Richard J. Anobile in The Marx Brothers Scrapbook, Groucho said he was so appalled by an early draft of the script, which was reportedly written by Bert Kalmar and Harry Ruby, that he screamed "Why fuck around with second-rate talent, get Kaufman and Ryskind [to write the screenplay]!"

Ryskind also rewrote the stage version of Room Service (1938), the original of which did not have the Marx Brothers, reworking the plot to make the movie suitable for the three distinctive performers.

During that period, Ryskind was twice nominated for an Academy Award for his part in writing the films My Man Godfrey (starring Carole Lombard, 1936) and Stage Door (starring Katharine Hepburn, 1937). Later, he wrote the screenplay for the successful Penny Serenade, wrote the stage musical Louisiana Purchase (which soon became a film starring Bob Hope) and supervised the production of The Lady Comes Across.

Political activism 
For many years Ryskind had been a member of the Socialist Party of America, and during the 1930s he participated in party-sponsored activities, even performing sketches at antiwar events, but he split with the party's "Old Guard faction," led by Louis Waldman. His politics soon moved to the political right. In 1940, Ryskind abandoned the Democratic Party, and he opposed President Franklin Delano Roosevelt's pursuit of a third term, writing the campaign song for that year's Republican Party presidential nominee Wendell Willkie. He maintained some ties to the Socialist Party throughout the 1940s and served as a vice chairman of the Keep America Out of War Congress.

Around then, he became a friend to writers Max Eastman, Ayn Rand, John Dos Passos, Suzanne La Follette and Raymond Moley.  Later, he would become friend to William F. Buckley, Jr. and future U.S. President Ronald Reagan.  In 1947, he appeared before the House Committee on Un-American Activities as a "Friendly Witness." Ryskind never sold another script after that appearance, and he believed that his appearance before HUAC was responsible although there is no direct evidence of an organized campaign against the "Friendly Witnesses."

In the 1950s, Ryskind contributed articles to The Freeman, In 1954, he was also a board member of the American Jewish League Against Communism.

Later, he lent money to Buckley to help start The National Review, which began publication in 1955, another journal to which he was an early contributor. Ryskind briefly joined the John Birch Society but soon disassociated himself from the group after it began to claim that Roosevelt, Harry Truman, and Dwight Eisenhower were part of the Soviet conspiracy. He was also a vocal sympathizer with the anti-Zionist American Council for Judaism.

In 1960, Ryskind started to write a feature column in the Los Angeles Times that promoted conservative ideas for the next 11 years. His son Allan H. Ryskind was the longtime editor of the conservative weekly Human Events.

The elder Ryskind's autobiography I Shot an Elephant in My Pajamas: The Morrie Ryskind Story details his adventures from Broadway to Hollywood as well as his conversion to conservative politics.

Stage productions 
Merry-Go-Round (1927, with Howard Dietz to music by Henry Souvaine and Jay Gorney)
Animal Crackers (1929, with George S. Kaufman to music and lyrics by Bert Kalmar and Harry Ruby)
Ned Wayburn's Gambols (1929, lyricist with music by Walter G. Samuels)
Strike up the Band (1930, bookwriter with music by George Gershwin and lyrics by Ira Gershwin)
The Gang's All Here (1931, contributing bookwriter)
Of Thee I Sing (1931, with George S. Kaufman to music by George Gershwin and lyrics by Ira Gershwin) - Pulitzer Prize for Drama)
Pardon My English (1933, with Herbert Fields to music by George Gershwin and lyrics by Ira Gershwin)
Let 'Em Eat Cake (1933 sequel to Of Thee I Sing, with George S. Kaufman to music by George Gershwin and lyrics by Ira Gershwin)
Louisiana Purchase (1941, bookwriter to music and lyrics by Irving Berlin, later, a film starring Bob Hope)
The Lady Comes Across (1942, theatre director)

Filmography 
The Cocoanuts (1929, starring the Marx Brothers)
Animal Crackers (1930, starring the Marx Brothers)
A Night at the Opera (1935, starring the Marx Brothers)
My Man Godfrey (1936) - Oscar nomination
Stage Door (1937) - Oscar nomination
Room Service (1938, starring the Marx Brothers)
Man About Town (1939)
His Girl Friday (1940), movie version of The Front Page
Penny Serenade (1941)
Claudia (1943)
Where Do We Go From Here? (1945)
It's in the Bag! (1945), starring Fred Allen

Bibliography 
 George S. Kaufman et al., Kaufman & Co.: Broadway Comedies, Laurence Maslon, ed. (New York: The Library of America, 2004 ; includes Animal Crackers and Of Thee I Sing)
 Animal Crackers (1928, with George S. Kaufman, New York: Samuel French's Musical Library, 1984 )
 Of Thee I Sing (1931, with George S. Kaufman and Ira Gershwin, New York: Knopf. 1932; Samuel French's Musical Library, 1963 )
 Let 'Em Eat Cake (1933, with George S. Kaufman and Ira Gershwin, New York: Knopf. 1933)
 I Shot an Elephant in My Pajamas: the Morrie Ryskind Story (with John H. M. Roberts, Lafayette, LA: Huntington House, 1994 )

References

External links 

 
 Morrie Ryskind papers, 1911–1985, held by the Billy Rose Theatre Division, New York Public Library for the Performing Arts

1895 births
1985 deaths
20th-century American dramatists and playwrights
Activists from New York (state)
American anti-war activists
American male screenwriters
American musical theatre librettists
American musical theatre lyricists
American people of Russian-Jewish descent
American political activists
Columbia University alumni
Jewish American dramatists and playwrights
John Birch Society members
Members of the Socialist Party of America
New York (state) Republicans
Old Right (United States)
Pulitzer Prize for Drama winners
Writers from Brooklyn
20th-century American male writers
20th-century American screenwriters
20th-century American Jews